The 2012 Southland Conference tournament was held at Roadrunner Field on the campus of the University of Texas at San Antonio in San Antonio, Texas, from May 11 through 13, 2012 after heavy rainfall in the San Antonio area forced a postponement of the tournament start. The tournament winner, Texas State Bobcats, earned the Southland Conference's automatic bid to the 2012 NCAA Division I softball tournament. The Championship game was broadcast on ESPN3 with the remainder of the tournament streaming on SLC NOW.  The championship game was called by Lincoln Rose and Chris Mycoskie.

Format
The top 6 teams qualified for the Southland softball tournament.  The tournament was played in a double-elimination format with a maximum of eleven games.

Tournament

All times listed are Central Daylight Time.

Line Scores

Day One

Game 1 (Central Arkansas vs UTSA)

Game 2 (Texas A&M-Corpus Christi vs McNeese State)

Game 3 (UTSA vs Texas State)

Game 4 (McNeese State vs Sam Houston State)

Day Two

Game 5 (UTSA vs Texas A&M-Corpus Christi)

Game 6 (Sam Houston State vs Central Arkansas)

Game 7 (Texas State vs McNeese State)

Semi-final Game One (Texas A&M-Corpus Christi vs Sam Houston State)

Semi-final Game Two (Sam Houston State vs McNeese State)

Day Three

Championship Game (Sam Houston State vs Texas State)

Awards and honors
Source:  

Tournament MVP: Chander Hall - Texas State

All-Tournament Teams:

 Caitlyn Ivy - UTSA
 Anna Hernandez - Texas State
 Shelby Carnline - Texas State
 Katie Roux - McNeese State
 Ashley Isbell - Sam Houston State
 Kim Damian - Sam Houston State
 Coralee Ramirez - Texas State
 Brooke Baker - Texas State
 Claire Terracina - McNeese State
 Tomi Garrison - Sam Houston State
 Chandler Hall - Texas State

See also
2012 Southland Conference baseball tournament

References

Southland Conference softball tournament
Tournament